The Thousand Guineas is a Melbourne Racing Club Group 1 Thoroughbred horse race for three year old fillies at set weights run over a distance of 1600 metres at Caulfield Racecourse, Melbourne, Australia in early October. Total prize money for the race is A$1,000,000.

History
Between 1988 and 2013 the race was scheduled on the second day of the MRC Spring Carnival which is held on a Wednesday but it was moved to the first day in 2014. Prior to 1988 the race was run on the third day of the carnival on the Caulfield Cup racecard.

Distance
 1946–1971 - 1 mile (~1600 metres)
 1972 onwards - 1600 metres

Grade
 1946–1978 - Principal Race
 1979 onwards - Group 1

1950 Racebook

Winners

 2022 - Madame Pommery
 2021 - Yearning
 2020 - Odeum
 2019 - Flit
 2018 - Amphitrite
 2017 - Aloisia
 2016 - Global Glamour
 2015 - Stay With Me
 2014 - Amicus
 2013 - Guelph
 2012 - Commanding Jewel
 2011 - Atlantic Jewel
 2010 - Yosei
 2009 - Irish Lights
 2008 - Gallica
 2007 - Serious Speed
 2006 - Miss Finland
 2005 - Mnemosyne
 2004 - Alinghi
 2003 - Special Harmony
 2002 - Macedon Lady
 2001 - Magical Miss
 2000 - All Time High
 1999 - Shizu
 1998 - Inaflury
 1997 - Lady Of The Pines
 1996 - Dashing Eagle
 1995 - Shame
 1994 - Northwood Plume
 1993 - Arborea
 1992 - Azzurro
 1991 - Richfield Lady
 1990 - Whisked
 1989 - Tristanagh
 1988 - Riverina Charm
 1987 - Bianco Flyer
 1986 - Magic Flute
 1985 - Shankhill Lass
 1984 - Goleen
 1983 - Perfect Bliss
 1982 - Rom’s Stiletto
 1981 - Copperama
 1980 - Biscadale
 1979 - Brava Jeannie
 1978 - Kapalaran
 1977 - Princess Talaria
 1976 - Savoir
 1975 - Toy Show
 1974 - Sufficient
 1973 - Just Topic
 1972 - Toltrice
 1971 - What’s The Verdict
 1970 - Tango Miss
 1969 - Wood Court Inn
 1968 - Our Faith
 1967 - Begonia Bell
 1966 - Cendrillon
 1965 - Gipsy Queen
 1964 - Reveille
 1963 - †Heirloom / Anna Rose
 1962 - Regal Peace
 1961 - Indian Summer
 1960 - Wenona Girl
 1959 - Chaise
 1958 - But Beautiful
 1957 - Goldenway
 1956 - Bendrum
 1955 - Brimses
 1954 - Lady Mogambo
 1953 - Olympic Girl
 1952 - Trunnion
 1951 - Golden Chariot
 1950 - True Course
 1949 - Chicquita
 1948 - Siren Song
 1947 - Nizam’s Ring
 1946 - Sweet Chime

† Dead heat

See also
 List of Australian Group races
 Group races

References

Flat horse races for three-year-old fillies
Group 1 stakes races in Australia
Caulfield Racecourse